Tomas Staffan Riad (born 15 November 1959) is a Swedish linguist, specialised in Swedish phonology and prosody. He received his Ph.D. from Stockholm University in 1992 and is professor at the Department of Scandinavian languages there. Riad is also a violinist, trained at the Royal College of Music in London and has worked as a full-time musician.  He was elected a member of the Swedish Academy on 29 September 2011 (taking his seat on 20 December).

Bibliography
 Squibs, remarks and replies (1988); co-authors: Elly van Gelderen &, Arild Hestvik
 Reflexivity and predication (1988)
 Structures in Germanic Prosody. A diachronic study with special reference to the Nordic languages (1992)
 Birgitta Trotzig – Svenska Akademien Inträdestal (2011)
 The Phonology of Swedish (2014)

As editor
 Tones and Tunes: Typological Studies in Word and Sentence Prosody (2007)
 Tones and Tunes: Experimental Studies in Word and Sentence Prosody (2007)
 Typological Studies in Word and Sentence Prosody (2007)
 Studier i svensk språkhistoria. 12, Variation och förändring (2014)

Notes

References
Peter Englund, "Ny ledamot, entry of 30 September 2011 in Englund's official blog as permanent secretary of the Academy
Calle Sandstedt, "Ny ledamot i Svenska Akademien", Svenska Dagbladet, 30 September 2011.

External links
Chair no. 6 – Tomas Riad Swedish Academy
Official page at Stockholm University
list of publications
Interview with Tomas Riad, Sveriges Television

Linguists from Sweden
Members of the Swedish Academy
1959 births
Living people
People from Uppsala
Stockholm University alumni
Academic staff of Stockholm University
Swedish violinists
Male violinists
21st-century violinists
21st-century Swedish male musicians